Collegiate summer baseball leagues are amateur baseball leagues in the United States and Canada featuring players who have attended at least one year of college and have at least one year of athletic eligibility remaining. Generally, they operate from early June to early August. In contrast to college baseball, which allow aluminum or other composite baseball bats, players in these leagues use only wooden bats, hence the common nickname of these leagues as "wood-bat leagues". Collegiate summer leagues allow college baseball players the ability to compete using professional rules and equipment, giving them experience and allowing professional scouts the opportunity to observe players under such conditions.

To find a collegiate summer team, players work with their college coaches and prospective teams' general managers. They report to summer leagues after completing their spring collegiate season with their NCAA, NAIA, NJCAA, CCCAA, and NWAC teams. Some players arrive late due to their college team's postseason play, which sometimes runs into early June. In some cases, players are drafted during the collegiate summer season. These draftees can remain with their collegiate summer team until they sign a professional contract. During the season, players are housed by volunteer host families and bussed to and from road games.

The leagues vary greatly in their attendances, quality of play, and ability to attract scouts. The Alaska Baseball League (ABL) and the Cape Cod Baseball League (CCBL) are considered the two premier collegiate summer leagues.

Active leagues
This list is organized by federation.

National Alliance of College Summer Baseball
Atlantic Collegiate Baseball League – Eastern Pennsylvania; Northern New Jersey; Staten Island, New York
Cal Ripken Collegiate Baseball League – Washington–Baltimore metropolitan area
California Collegiate League 
Cape Cod Baseball League – Cape Cod area of Massachusetts
Florida Collegiate Summer League – Orlando area
Great Lakes Summer Collegiate League – Mostly in Ohio, also with teams in Michigan, Indiana, and the Canadian province of Ontario
Hamptons Collegiate Baseball League – The Hamptons (Eastern Long Island, New York)
New England Collegiate Baseball League – New England
New York Collegiate Baseball League – Central and western New York state
Southern Collegiate Baseball League – Charlotte metropolitan area (North and South Carolina)
Sunbelt Baseball League – Atlanta metropolitan area
Valley Baseball League – Shenandoah Valley and nearby areas (Virginia)
Source:

National Amateur Baseball Federation 
Florida Collegiate Summer League
Great Lakes Bay Baseball Association
Great Lakes United Baseball League
Metropolitan Collegiate Summer Baseball League of Illinois
New York Collegiate Baseball League
Northern League
St. Louis Metro Collegiate Instructional Baseball League
Tri-State Collegiate League

National Baseball Congress
Alaska Baseball League
CenTex Collegiate League
Coastal Collegiate League
Houston Collegiate Summer League
Ohio Valley League
Pacific International League
Rocky Mountain Baseball League
Sunflower Collegiate League
Western Baseball Association

Minor League Baseball Prospect Development Pipeline
Appalachian League

Other (unaffiliated) leagues

All-American Amateur Baseball Association - Pennsylvania
Arizona Collegiate Wood Bat League 
Atlantic Baseball Confederation - New Jersey 
Ban Johnson Amateur Baseball League
Bay Area Collegiate League
Beach Collegiate Summer Baseball League
Blue Chip Collegiate Baseball League (Formerly known as the LICBL)
Cascade Collegiate League
Centennial State League - Northern Colorado
Coastal Plain League 
Collegiate Baseball League Europe
Connecticut Collegiate Baseball League
Corn Belt Baseball League
Cotton States Baseball League
Futures Collegiate Baseball League 
Golden State Collegiate Baseball League
Greater Northeast Collegiate Baseball League (GNCBL)
Honor the Game College Wood Bat League
Hudson Valley Collegiate Baseball League
Independence League Baseball
Interstate Collegiate Baseball League
Kansas Collegiate League
Maryland Collegiate Baseball League
Mid-Plains League
Mile High Collegiate Baseball League
 MLB Draft League – starting play in 2021
 M.I.N.K. Collegiate Baseball League 
New Jersey Amateur Baseball League
Northwoods League 
Ohio Valley Summer Collegiate Baseball League
Old North State League
Pacific Coast Collegiate League 
Palm Springs Collegiate League
Perfect Game Collegiate Baseball League 
Piedmont Collegiate Baseball League
Play Ball Collegiate League
Prospect League 
Rockingham County Baseball League
Southern California Collegiate Baseball League
Sunset Baseball League
Texas Collegiate League
Tidewater Summer League
West Coast League
Western Canadian Baseball League 
Wild Wild West League

Defunct leagues
 Basin League
 Big States League
Central Illinois Collegiate League
Clark Griffith Collegiate Baseball League
 Eastern Collegiate Baseball League
Expedition League
Far West League
Great West League
Hawaii Collegiate Baseball League 
Horizon Air Summer Series 
 Jayhawk Collegiate League 
 KIT Summer Collegiate Baseball League
Lewis & Clark Baseball League
 Mountain Atlantic Collegiate Baseball League
 Mountain West Summer Collegiate Baseball
 Northern League (1936–1941, 1946–1950, 1952; mainly in New York and Vermont)
Pacific West Baseball League
Puget Sound Collegiate League
Saskatchewan Major Baseball League
 Sierra Baseball League
 Thorobred Collegiate Baseball League

See also
 Scenic West Athletic Conference, a junior-college league that uses wooden bats in conference play during the standard college baseball season

References

External links
Collegiate Summer Baseball website
Ballpark Digest
Baseball America Summer Scene
Collegiate Summer Baseball Register

 
 
 
Summer League